Rittmeyer is a surname. Notable people with the surname include:

Immo Rittmeyer (born 1936), German cyclist
Nico Rittmeyer (born 1993), American-born Guatemalan soccer player

German-language surnames